Pui Ching Middle School is a Baptist secondary school in Ho Man Tin, Kowloon, Hong Kong. Founded in 1889, it currently has sister schools in Macau and Guangzhou.

Mission Statement 
The school adopts "至善至正" as its motto. It aims to offer students a holistic education upon Christian principles and Confucianism "止於至善" from Great Learning (大學).

"Observe and hear all these words which I command thee, that it may go well with thee, and with thy children after thee for ever, when thou doest that which is good and right in the eyes of the LORD thy God."—Deuteronomy 12:28

"Good and upright is the LORD: therefore will he instruct sinners in the way." -- Psalm 25:8 King James Bible

History
The Hong Kong branch was established in 1933 in Ho Man Tin. Initially, only primary school education was offered; a junior high school division using Chinese as medium of instruction was established in 1938, a senior high division was established in 1940. The school was suspended during Japanese occupation of Hong Kong during World War II. Students and staff went to Macau and mainland China. In 1945, the school moved back to a temporary site in Kowloon Tong and in 1946, the school moved back to Ho Man Tin. In 1950, the school was renamed from a Hong Kong branch of the Canton school to the present name. In 1952, a new extension on the land donated by Hong Kong Government was built and completed in September 1953. The premises are located at Pui Ching Road which was named after the school.

Notable alumni 

 Daniel Chee Tsui, 崔琦, Nobel Prize Laureate in Physics, 1998.
 Shing-Tung Yau, 丘成桐, mathematician, awarded the Fields Medal in 1982. Calabi–Yau manifold was named after him. Awarded Wolf Prize in Mathematics in 2010.
 Alfred Y. Cho, 卓以和, father of molecular beam epitaxy and quantum cascade lasers. former Vice President of Semiconductor Research at Bell Labs, Awarded US National Medal of Science in 1993 and US National Medal of Technology in 2007. Inducted into the US National Inventors Hall of Fame in 2009.
 Yum-Tong Siu, 蕭蔭堂, mathematician, William Elwood Byerly Professor of Mathematics, Harvard University
 Shiu-Yuen Cheng, 鄭紹遠, former Dean of Science of the Hong Kong University of Science and Technology, now Chair Professor of Mathematics at Hong Kong University of Science and Technology
 Sun Kwok, 郭新, founder of Interactive Wind Model in Planetary Nebula, Dean of Science of University of Hong Kong
 Chia-Wei Woo, 吳家瑋, founding President of the Hong Kong University of Science and Technology
 King-Fai Chung, 鍾景輝, first dean, the Hong Kong Academy for the Performing Arts. BBS
 Paul Tsai-Pao Wong, 王载宝, founding director of Graduate Program in Counselling Psychology at Trinity Western University and president of the International Network on Personal Meaning
 Daniel Tse Chi-wai, 謝志偉, former President of Hong Kong Baptist University 
 Ng Ching-fai, 吳清渾, former President of Hong Kong Baptist University
 John Hung, 洪𠄘禧, former chairman, Wheelock & Co, former executive director, Wharf Holdings
 Joseph King-Tak Lee, M.D., Chairman Emeritus and Dr. Ernest H. Wood Distinguished Professor of Radiology, Depart. of Radiology University of North Carolina at Chapel Hill. Author of Computed Body Tomography with MRI Correlation.
 Kwing Lam Chan, 陳炯林, Dean of Space Science Institute and Director of Lunar and Planetary Science Laboratory, Macau University of Science and Technology, Head of the Department of Mathematics, Hong Kong University of Science and Technology, Application Research Scientist, China Chang'E Lunar Exploration.
 Chung-Kong Chow, 周松崗, former CEO of Hong Kong MTR; chairman, Hong Kong Stock Exchange
 Henry Tang, 唐英年, former Chief Secretary of the Hong Kong SAR Government
 Ian Huang, 黃源源, former Visiting Chief Architect, Singapore National Science & Technology Board (A*STAR), Co-inventor of [[SCSI (Small Computer System Interface) and FDDI (Fiber Distributed Data Interface)]].
 Edmond Ko, 高彥鳴, former senior advisor to the Provost, Director of the Center for Engineering Education Innovation at Hong Kong University for Science & Technology; former Vice Provost, Carnegie Mellon University; former vice president, City University of Hong Kong.
 Siu-Weng Simon Wong 黃兆永, former & founding CEO, Hong Kong Applied Science and Technology Research Institute (ASTRI)
 Simon Peh Yun Lu 白韞六, Commissioner, Independent Commission Against Corruption; former Director of Immigration Department Hong Kong.
 Wong Jing, 王晶, film director, producer, and screenwriter in Hong Kong
 Regina Tsang 曾慶瑜, Third Place 季军, Miss Hong Kong Pageant 1978
 Maria Wai-Bing Chung 鍾慧冰, Third Place 季军, Miss Hong Kong Pageant 1979, Hong Kong movie director and actress
 Gigi Lai, 黎姿, Hong Kong actress
 Sammul Chan, 陳鍵鋒 (陳恩耀), Hong Kong actor

 Cindy Au, 歐倩怡, Hong Kong actress

See also 
 Pui Ching Middle School
 Education in Hong Kong
 List of schools in Hong Kong
 Pui Ching Invitational Mathematics Competition

References

External links 

 Pui Ching Alumni

Protestant secondary schools in Hong Kong
Secondary schools in Ho Man Tin
Educational institutions established in 1889
1889 establishments in Hong Kong